The Cocytiini are a tribe of moths in the family Erebidae. Adults of some members of the subfamily, especially in the genus Serrodes, have a proboscis capable of piercing fruit skins, allowing the moth to drink the fruit juice.

Taxonomy
The tribe may be most closely related to the clade containing the tribes Poaphilini and Ophiusini, also within the Erebinae.

Genera

Anereuthina
Avatha
Cocytia
Ophyx
Serrodes

References

 
Erebinae
Moth tribes